Impossible Love EP is an EP by Australian alternative rock band Machine Gun Fellatio, released in 2000.

Track listing

Charts

References

Machine Gun Fellatio albums
2000 EPs